A Scientific Support for Darwinism (And For Public Schools Not To Teach "Intelligent Design" As Science) was a four-day, word-of-mouth petition of scientists in support of evolution. Inspired by Project Steve, it was initiated in 2005 by archaeologist R. Joe Brandon to produce a public response to the Discovery Institute's 2001 petition A Scientific Dissent From Darwinism.

The Discovery Institute's petition was publicized in 2005 by media coverage of the Discovery Institute's efforts to introduce intelligent design in science classrooms and the opposition to those efforts in the Kitzmiller v. Dover Area School District case. Brandon noticed that only about 80 of those appearing on the Dissent petition had expertise in an area relevant to evolution. Therefore, Brandon decided to create a petition of his own of scientists supporting evolution. The petition was hosted at ShovelBums.org, but has since been removed from the site.

A total of 7,733 scientists signed a statement affirming their support for evolution over a four-day period.

Statement
The statement was entitled A Scientific Support for Darwinism And For Public Schools Not To Teach "Intelligent Design" As Science, and read:

Results

In four days in the fall of 2005, starting on September 28, 2005, and ending at 4:09 pm Eastern Time, October 1, 2005, the petition supporting "Darwinism" gathered 7,733 verified signatures from concerned scientists. Of these, 6,965 were US residents and 4,066 had PhDs. The "Four Day Petition" was carried out with no outside funding or assistance of any professional society. The effort was carried out by email and word-of-mouth.

Among the signatories were 21 U.S. National Academy of Sciences members, nine MacArthur Fellowship awardees, and a Nobel laureate. According to Brandon's analysis, of those who signed his petition, there were

3,385 with biology in their title
850 with anthropology/archaeology
680 with evolutionary & ecology
394 from the field of genetics
270 from geology and related fields
234 from the fields of physics, astronomy, or space sciences
111 chemists
110 psychologists
75 computer scientists
50 engineers

Therefore, about 68 percent of those signing the Brandon petition work in biology-related fields (using the first four categories from the list above).

This "Scientific Support" petition collected signatures at a rapid pace. The responses to the Brandon petition arrived at a rate 697,000% faster than the signatures collected on the Discovery Institute Darwin Dissent petition.

History
Brandon's original goal was to get 400 petition signatures in four hours. However, Brandon found he was 75 signatures short after four hours, and so he decided to extend his collection period to four days. The emails became more frequent, and at one point, petition responses were arriving every 3.5 seconds. However, the 325 signatures collected in the first four hours can be compared to the Discovery Institute's gathering of 400 signatures of self-identified scientists, most in irrelevant fields, in four years. In the week after the close of the four-day period, another several thousand signatures arrived, but were not included in the official tally.

One signatory, Dr. Steve Brill of Rutgers University, stated,

In a press release on October 20, 2005, announcing the results of the "Four Day Petition", Brandon drew attention to the remarks of Discovery Institute Senior Fellow Michael Behe's faculty colleagues in the biological sciences at Lehigh University. Twenty of Behe's peers remarked collectively that

{{quote|As Michael J. Behe's faculty colleagues... we lend our voices to the chorus of nearly all scientists who conclude that 'Intelligent Design' is not a scientific theory, but rather a loosely veiled attempt to explain natural phenomena by invoking the concept of a supernatural entity. Intelligent Design is not a scientific alternative to Darwinian evolution and has no place in the biology classroom.<ref name=press>[http://www.prnewswire.com/cgi-bin/stories.pl?ACCT=104&STORY=/www/story/10-20-2005/0004173856&EDATE= PRNewsWire Thousands of Scientists Sign Petition Opposing the Teaching of Intelligent Design as Science: No Debate Among Scientists - Regardless of Faith, Intelligent Design Is Not Science], official text of press release, PR Newswire, Columbus, Ohio, October 20, 2005.</ref>}}

Another signatory, biologist Mark Siddall of the American Museum of Natural History stated,

Siddall added "R. Joe's efforts elicited an overwhelming response from the scientific community—one that cut across lines of faith as deeply as it did across fields of scientific study." Siddall also assisted Brandon in checking that the IP addresses of the respondents corresponded to the institutions they claimed to be affiliated with.

Brandon's original plan was to compile the signatures that he obtained and pass them on to Judge John E. Jones III who was handling the Kitzmiller v. Dover Area School District case, as well as announce the results in a press release. The petition was not completed sufficiently early to submit it as part of an amicus curae brief for the Dover case. However, if the case was to go to the US Supreme Court, the petition could have been submitted as an amicus'' brief at that time.

R. Joe Brandon emphasized that this "Four Day Petition" did not mean that scientific issues are settled by majority vote. What Brandon maintains is that this is an indication of the level of scientific consensus that accepts evolution as a viable established scientific theory that has passed a large number of hurdles and is supported by an immense amount of evidence.

See also 
 Clergy Letter Project
 Creation–evolution controversy
 Intelligent design movement
 Level of support for evolution

References

2005 in science
Criticism of intelligent design
Darwinism
Religion and science
Science activism